The Mignano Gap is a geographic feature in Italy, in the vicinity of Mignano Monte Lungo. During World War II, this was the location of the German Bernhardt Line.

References

Fifth Army At The Winter Line

Mountain passes of Italy